Eleodes nigropilosa is a species of desert stink beetle in the family Tenebrionidae. It is found in California and Baja California. Due to its hair, it is similar to Eleodes osculans and Eleodes littoralis.

References

Further reading

External links

 

Tenebrionoidea
Beetles described in 1851